Master of the Hunt or Huntmaster can refer to

A court appointment in royal households
Master of the hunt (Polish–Lithuanian Commonwealth), Polish court official
Grand Huntsman of France, a French court official
An office held in the organization of hunting in a particular area, such as the Master of foxhounds in hunts that use dogs
The leader of the mythological Wild Hunt